On March 24, 2014, a Chicago Transit Authority (CTA) passenger train overran the bumper at O'Hare station, injuring 34 people.

Accident
The front car of the eight-car train partially ascended an escalator. At least 50 firefighters and paramedics responded to the accident. Thirty-four people were injured. They were taken to the Advocate Lutheran General Hospital, the Our Lady of the Resurrection Medical Center, the Resurrection Hospital and the Swedish Covenant Hospital.

A CTA spokesman initially stated that the line could be closed for as long as 48 hours while recovery of the train was undertaken. This was later revised upwards to a week. The front two cars of the train were damaged in the accident. Damage was estimated at $6,000,000. On March 26, work began to scrap the lead car on site. The derailed train was removed from the station on March 27. The station reopened on March 30, 2014 at 2:00 p.m. The escalator damaged in the crash was replaced by stairs. Damage amounted to $11,196,796.

Train
Photographs show that the train involved in the accident was made up of four two-car 2600-series trainsets, with 3061/3062 as the leading pair.

Investigation
The National Transportation Safety Board (NTSB) opened an investigation into the accident. Investigators focused on the theory that the motorwoman, 25-year-old Brittney Tysheka Haywood, fell asleep at the controls. She stated that she had recently performed "a lot of overtime". She did not reveal to CTA that she had fallen asleep when questioned about the overshoot. The investigation was hampered by the train's lack of a train event recorder, although it was fitted with a video camera. The recording from the camera was examined. Images from 41 cameras within the station were also studied. The NTSB's report ultimately confirmed the original findings.

Aftermath
The area of the speed limit was also extended away from the station. The train operator was fired.

References

External links
 
 

2014 disasters in the United States
Railway accidents and incidents in Illinois
Railway accidents in 2014
O'Hare International Airport
2014 in Illinois
Accidents and incidents involving Chicago Transit Authority
March 2014 events in the United States